Canadian National Railway (CN) Class K-3 steam locomotives were of 4-6-2 wheel arrangement in the Whyte notation, or " 2'C1' " in UIC classification. 70 of these locomotives were built for the Grand Trunk Railway (GT) from 1910 through 1913. The class remained in passenger service until the final replacement of steam with diesel locomotives. Number 5588 was preserved in Windsor, Ontario.

References 

4-6-2 locomotives
Baldwin locomotives
MLW locomotives
K-3
Passenger locomotives
Railway locomotives introduced in 1910